Icaria  is an unreleased Russian fantasy drama. It was directed by Javor Gardev and starred Ivan Yankovsky and Mariya Fomina.

Plot
Icaria is set in the year 2027. Science has made a breakthrough in genetics and transplantology, which promised immortality. However, participants recruited for this immortality experiment are required to participate in a death adventure TV game show.

Cast

Production

Filming 
Filming took place in Moscow and Malta, where they shot scenes simulating Crete and Icaria. Filming concluded in August 2016.

References

External links

Unreleased films
Russian science fiction drama films
Russian dystopian films
Russian-language films
Films about death games